The 2013 FIBA Europe Under-20 Championship Division B was the ninth edition of the Division B of the FIBA Europe Under-20 Championship, the second-tier of European U-20 basketball. As in 2008, the tournament was held in Romania. Pitești was the host city.

Venues

Teams

First round
Twelve teams were allocated in two groups or six teams each. The top four teams advanced to the Quarterfinals, whereas the last two teams played for the 9th–12th place in the Classification Games.

Group A

|}

Group B

|}

Classification Games for 9th – 12th place
The last two teams of each group competed in a round robin for the 9th–12th place.

Group C

|}

Playoffs

Quarterfinals

5th–8th place semifinals

Championship semifinals

Final classification games

7th place game

5th place game

Bronze medal game

Final

Final standings

Awards 

All-Tournament Team
 Devon Van Oostrum
 Mateusz Ponitka
 Przemyslaw Karnowski
 Rosco Allen
 Emmanuel Lecomte

Stat leaders

References
 FIBA Europe

FIBA U20 European Championship Division B
2013–14 in European basketball
2013–14 in Romanian basketball
International youth basketball competitions hosted by Romania